The Independent School League (ISL) is composed of sixteen New England preparatory schools that compete athletically and academically. Founded in 1948, the ISL's sixteen members compete in eighteen sports in the New England Prep School Athletic Conference (NEPSAC). Notable to the league, they do not allow for schools to have postgraduate students compete in athletic competition, and consequently, many of the member institutions do not offer postgraduate programs. ISL schools are also not allowed to give athletic or academic based scholarships, and are only allowed to give need-based ones. The teams that make up the ISL are some of the highest rated schools in New England both academically and athletically.

History
Charter members of the Private School League were Belmont Hill, Brooks, Buckingham Browne & Nichols (BB&N), The Governor's Academy, Milton Academy, Noble & Greenough, St. Mark's, and Tabor. Like the Ivy League, the ISL began as a loose affiliation to promote football among academically rigorous, Northeastern schools; however, administrators formalized the league during 1948.

In 1968 Middlesex joined, and in 1972 Groton replaced Tabor – both private boarding schools in the Boston area.

In 1973 St. Sebastian's was added and in 1974 Roxbury Latin was added. The league changed its name to the 'Independent School League' in 1974.

St. Paul's, Lawrence Academy, The Rivers School and St. George's joined during the mid-1970s.

For 2017-2018, with the departure of St. Paul's School, a new addition to the Independent School League is Tabor Academy (Massachusetts), joining the league in 2017 after playing as a non-league competitor against several of the schools for many years, and being one of the original founding members.

Members

Reputation

ISL schools are noted for high tuition, wealthy students, academic excellence, superior college placement, athletics, and in many cases, storied histories. For example, the ISL features one of the United States' ten wealthiest boarding schools, Groton.

The ISL features two of the United States' ten oldest boarding schools, Governor's and Lawrence, and the oldest school in continuous existence in North America, Roxbury Latin.

The ISL also boasts the only day school to make the 2006 Forbes Most Expensive Private High Schools list: The Buckingham Browne and Nichols School.

Leadership
Each school's athletic program is run by an experienced and well-respected administrator, many of whom rose to their positions after successful coaching careers either at their present school or prior to their arrival.

Sports

Member schools compete in the following sports:

Baseball
Basketball
Crew
Cross country
Field hockey
Football
Golf
Ice hockey
Lacrosse
Sailing
Skiing
Soccer
Softball
Squash
Swimming and diving
Tennis
Track and field
Volleyball
Wrestling

Football
The ISL is currently divided into two divisions - the ISL 7 and ISL 9. Below are the 2017 divisions.

In 2020, the football season was cancelled due to COVID-19 pandemic
In 2019, Milton Academy won the ISL Championship, going a perfect 8-0.
In 2018, St. Sebastian's, BBN & Belmont Hill shared the ISL Championship with 7-1 records.
In 2017, Lawrence Academy (ISL 7) and Brooks School (ISL 9) claimed the league championship and both teams went on to win their respective NEPSAC Bowl Games.
In 2016, Brooks won the ISL going 7-1 (4-0 in ISL 10) by defeating Lawrence Academy 20-0 in week 8 to clinch the title and a Bowl Game appearance.
In 2015, St. George's won the ISL Championship with an 8-0 record, and won their bowl game to complete an undefeated season at 9-0.
In 2014, Brooks, Governors Academy and Lawrence Academy shared the ISL title.
In 2013, Milton Academy and Governors Academy shared the ISL Championship and both teams went on to win their respective NEPSAC Bowl Games.
In 2012, St. Sebastian's and The Governor's Academy won the Independent School League both going undefeated (9-0), and winning their respective bowl games.
In 2011, Governors Academy won the Independent School League Championships.

Boys' Ice Hockey
The ISL is divided into two divisions for boys' ice hockey - the Keller Division and Eberhart Division

2018-19 Champions: Lawrence Academy (Keller) and The Rivers School (Eberhart)

In 2017, The Rivers School won the ISL Eberhart Division for the third time in four years (2013–14, 2015–16, 2016–17) and qualified for the New England Preparatory School Athletic Council Stuart/Corkery Open Tournament, becoming the first ISL Eberhart Division team to do so. Rivers defeated Belmont Hill School and Phillips Exeter Academy to reach the final, where they lost to Kimball Union Academy.In 2014-2015 and 2015-2016 season St. Marks School won the New England Prep Small School Championship, and in the 2014-2015 season Brooks School won the New England Prep Large School Championship. Both teams were from the Eberhart division on the ISL.

In 2011-2012 Lawrence Academy won the Independent School League Championship, as well as the NEPSAC championship defeating Nobles in the final round (3-2). In 2010-2011 Milton Academy went to win the Independent School League championship for ice hockey and then continued the success to win it all in the NEPSAC championship. In the 2009-2010 hockey season Nobles won the ISL championship. In the 2008-2009 hockey season Lawrence Academy won the ISL championships.

In 1988—then Governor Dummer Academy—won the Eberhart Division and the NEPSAC Div. II Championship defeating The Gunnery School.  That win propelled GDA into the prestigious Keller Division where it has competed since 1988-89.

Of all the schools in the ISL, it is the newest, St. Sebastian's, that has had the most first round NHL draft picks (5). Their 5 picks are more than any high school in the US. Their most recent was in the 2015 NHL draft, when Noah Hannifin was drafted 5th overall to the Carolina Hurricanes.

Boys' Soccer
In 1948 eight local private schools banded together to form one of the first high school soccer leagues in the area. A number of the schools had been competing informally and a structured league was desirable. Full round robin play was not achieved until 1952 but has been a constant feature since that year. The original eight schools included Belmont Hill, Brooks, Browne & Nichols, Governor Dummer, Milton, Nobles, St. Mark's, and Tabor.

In 1948 a championship cup was procured and was named in honor of Richard Gummere, a longtime teacher and coach at both Browne & Nichols and Haverford College; the Gummere Cup is undoubtedly one of the oldest secondary school soccer trophies in the country. In 1968 Middlesex joined the group and in 1971 Roxbury Latin competed before joining permanently in 1974. 1972 saw Tabor leave the league and Groton join. That brought the league to ten schools where it remained until 1984.

The original Private School League had expanded during this time and had grown into the 16 school Independent School League. In order to include the six ISL schools not in Gummere Cup play at the time (Lawrence, Rivers, St. George's, St. Paul's, St. Sebastian's, and Thayer) the Athletic Directors created a separate ISL soccer league in 1980.

Because full round robin play was not possible at that time, North and South Divisions, each with eight schools, were established. A Championship Final was held on the Wednesday following the regular season.

Both the Gummere Cup and ISL competitions operated simultaneously from 1980 through 1983. Due to the ban on post season league-sponsored play no finals were held in 1982 and 1983. In 1984, a full round robin schedule was adopted and all sixteen schools began competing for the Gummere Cup. No league games were played nor championship conferred in the fall of 2020 because of the COVID-19 pandemic.

The ISL has a tradition of providing a high level of play in soccer, fielding many competitive teams each year and sending numerous athletes to various college programs across the country each year.

Girls' Soccer 
Noble & Greenough have been the preeminent team in the ISL since 1981 and claimed the 2016 ISL Championship.

Boys' Lacrosse

ISL lacrosse has sent many players to top division one (D1) lacrosse universities, and has had numerous All-Americans.

Tennis
Boys ISL Champions: Groton School (15-0)

Girls ISL Champions: Milton Academy (15-0)

Girls' Ice Hockey
Many ISL schools participate in girls' ice hockey. The ISL has sent many women to D1 schools and to the Olympics. The 2018 champions were the Tabor Academy Seawolves (12-1).

Boys' Basketball 
The Independent School League has produced some of the finest players in New England High School Basketball history in addition to being an incredibly deep and competitive league. Since 2000, ISL players have earned the Gatorade Massachusetts State Player of the Year award six times:  Mike Jones (Thayer Academy, 2003), Richard Roby (Lawrence Academy, 2004), Stevie Mejia (Lawrence Academy, 2008), Nate Lubick (St. Mark's School, 2009 & 2010), and Azar Swain (The Rivers School, 2017).

Brooks School won its fifth consecutive ISL Championship in 2019 posting a perfect 15-0 record in league play for the fifth consecutive season. At the end of the 2018-19 season, Brooks' ISL winning streak sat at 84-straight victories while its overall winning streak was snapped by Hamden Hall in the first game of the season, ending a run of 66-straight victories.

The Rivers School won the ISL Championship in 2013-14, posting a perfect 15-0 record in league play.

Girls' Basketball 
The 2018 and 2019 ISL champion was the undefeated (13-0 and 10-0) Tabor Academy basketball team. Prior to Tabor joining the league and earning their 2018 and 2019 championships, Noble & Greenough had won the previous 14 Independent School League Championships. (2004-2017)

Baseball 
St. Sebastian's won back-to-back ISL Championships in 2017 and 2018. They previously had won the league title in 2007 and 1996.

The Governor's Academy claimed the 2016 ISL Championship with a 12-4 record.

In 2012, Belmont Hill won the ISL championship by beating BB&N 11-1.

In 2011, Lawrence Academy capped of an undefeated ISL season(16-0,18-2 Overall) by defeating Rivers 13-2 and winning the league title.

BB&N is the 2010 ISL champion after completing the first undefeated season (20-0) in school history.

Belmont HIll, Lawrence Academy, St. Sebastian's, Milton Academy, and Governor's Academy are also consistently at the top of the league.

Softball 
BB&N won the ISL in 2018 by posting a perfect 10-0 record.

The Governor's Academy has dominated the ISL in recent years, claiming six championships in seven years between 2011 and 2017.

Brooks was the preeminent team in the ISL from 1999 through 2007, claiming seven championships in nine seasons.

Crew 
Only a few ISL schools have crew programs, including Belmont Hill, BB&N, Brooks, Groton, Middlesex, Nobles, Thayer, and St. Mark's. ISL schools race four-man boats, and compete with the other ISL schools in head-to-head regattas.  The regular season ends with the NEIRA regatta, with the top two boats automatically entered into the National Championships in Cincinnati, Ohio.  Almost every year, a New England boat wins the national title.  Some perennially strong crews include BB&N, Groton, Middlesex, Nobles, and Brooks, but Belmont Hill has been the most dominant program of late, they have won eight consecutive New England Championships (2003–2010) and four National Championships (2003, 2006, 2007, 2010) with its first boat.

Golf 
ISL schools which participate in golf: Belmont Hill, Brooks, BB&N, Governors, Lawrence, Middlesex, Milton, Nobles, Rivers, St. George's, St. Mark's, St. Sebastian's, Tabor, and Thayer.

The schools play match play and their season takes place in the spring as opposed to the fall (Most publics and Catholics play in the fall.)  There is a league championship each year awarded by a point system and there also is a stroke play championship (The Kingman Cup) each year.

Wrestling 
From the 90's to present, ISL wrestling has been dominated by Belmont Hill. The team has won the ISL Dual Meet 15 times; has won 15 Graves Kelsey (ISL) Championships and won New England Championships in 2007, 2009, 2016, 2018, and 2019.

References

 
High school sports conferences and leagues in the United States
Preparatory schools in the United States